The 2018 Malaysia Challenge Cup or Challenge Cup (Malay: Piala Cabaran Malaysia 2018) is the first edition of Malaysia Challenge Cup tournament organised by Football Association of Malaysia (FAM) and Football Malaysia LLP (FMLLP).

The 2018 Malaysia Challenge Cup will start with a preliminary round. A total of 8 teams took part in the competition. The teams were divided into two groups, each containing four teams. The group leaders and runners-up teams in the groups after six matches qualified to the semi-finals.

Format
The competition will be one involving eight teams-one team from Malaysia Super League (12th placed team), seven teams from Malaysia Premier League (6th to 12th placed teams). However due to the fact that Kuantan were thrown out of the league, another team will be invited into the Challenge Cup to replaced them.

Round and draw dates 
The draw for the 2018 Malaysia Challenge Cup was held on 1 August 2018.

Group stage

Group A

Group B

Knockout stage

Bracket

Semifinals
|-

|}

Semi-finals

First Leg

Second Leg

UKM won 2−1 on aggregate. 

First Leg

Second Leg

Terengganu II won 5−0 on aggregate.

Final
The first legs will be played on 8 October 2018, and the second legs will be played on 15 October 2018

Terengganu II won 4−2 on aggregate.

Statistics

Top scorers

Hat-tricks 

5 Player scored five goals

Clean sheets

See also
 2018 Malaysia Premier League
 2018 Malaysia FAM Cup
 2018 Malaysia FA Cup
 2018 Malaysia Cup
 2018 Piala Presiden
 2018 Piala Belia

References

External links 
 

2018 in Malaysian football